Frank Crow is the name of:

Frank Fools Crow (died 1989), Oglala Lakota spiritual leader, Yuwipi medicine man, and the nephew of Black Elk
Frank Crowe (1882–1946), chief engineer of the Hoover Dam
 Frank W. Crowe (1919–1987), American physician
Franklin C. Crow, computer graphics researcher